Midnight Caller is a drama television series that aired on NBC. It was created by Richard DiLello, and was one of the first television series to address the dramatic possibilities of the then-growing phenomenon of talk radio. The series ran 3 seasons from 1988 to 1991, airing a total of 61 episodes.

Series overview

Episodes

Season 1 (1988–89)

Season 2 (1989–90)

Season 3 (1990–91)

References

External links 
 
 

Lists of American drama television series episodes